The 2011 Castleford Tigers season was the club's 14th year in the Super League. The club finished in 9th place, one position below the play-offs. Castleford also reached the semi final of the Challenge Cup, but lost 8–10 against Leeds Rhinos in extra time.

Super League table

References

Castleford Tigers seasons
Castleford Tigers